Ginger Hall is an uphill left-hand bend following Sulby Bridge on the Isle of Man TT course, a traditionally popular spectator and photographer vantage point with views of motorcycles approaching from Sulby Bridge and exiting towards Kerrowmoar. Situated on a corner-junction, the adjacent Ginger Hall Hotel dates from the mid-19th century and offers refreshments and access to another major viewing area at the Bungalow close to the summit of Snaefell mountain via the B8 Claddagh Road and the A14 Sulby Road.

References

External links
 Prohibited and Restricted Areas for the Isle of Man TT Races, Classic TT and Manx Grand Prix, Pages 26–28  Sulby Bridge, Lhen View Cottage, Ginger Hall and  Tranquillity House, Kerrowmoar
Ginger Hall, Isle of Man pics, at Flickr

Roads in the Isle of Man
Geography of the Isle of Man